The  is a Japanese role-playing video game franchise developed and published by Bandai Namco Entertainment, formerly Namco, for arcades and home video game platforms. Beginning in 1984 with the arcade title The Tower of Druaga, the series would spawn a total of nine sequel and spin-off games, alongside a manga, soundtrack albums, and two anime series by Gonzo K.K.  Later entries in the series would be developed by Endo's personal game company, Game Studio.

The series was created by Masanobu Endō, who had previously created Xevious and Grobda. Much of its characters and setting are inspired from Sumerian and Babylonian mythology, such as The Epic of Gilgamesh and The Tower of Babel. The series stars Prince Gilgamesh, a gold-armored knight, and the maiden Ki, in their efforts to protect the mythical Blue Crystal Rod and seal away Druaga, a four-armed demon who seeks the rod to enslave the human race.

The series is known for its high difficulty and for helping to establish the "notebook carrying" trend for Japanese video games - it would also serve as a prime inspiration for other games to follow, including Ys, Hydlide and The Legend of Zelda. Dragon Quest co-creator Koichi Nakamura has also cited the series as a key inspiration for him. International reviews for the series were mixed, with its difficulty and learning curve often criticized, although praise was given for its musical score and historical importance. Several games in the series would be ported over to both digital storefronts and various Namco video game collection titles in following years.

List of games

There are four games in the main series.
 The Tower of Druaga (1984, Namco, arcade)
 The Return of Ishtar (1986, Namco, arcade)
 The Quest of Ki (1988, Namco, Famicom)
 The Blue Crystal Rod (1994, Namco, Super Famicom)

In the game's canon, the chronological order is The Quest of Ki, The Tower of Druaga, The Return of Ishtar, and The Blue Crystal Rod.

Also, some side stories were made, including:

 The Tower of Druaga Darkness Tower (1996): Namco Museum Vol. 3
 The Tower of Druaga Another Tower (1996): Namco Museum Vol. 3, Famicom, Game Boy
 Seme COM Dungeon: Drururuaga (2000): Game Boy Color
 The Nightmare of Druaga: Fushigi no Dungeon (2004): PlayStation 2
 Druaga Online: The Story of Aon (2005): Arcade
 The Tower of Druaga: The Recovery of BABYLIM (2007): PC
 The Labyrinth of Druaga (2011, Namco, Mobile phones)

The Tower of Druaga 

The player assumes the role of the hero Gilgamesh, whose goal is to rescue the maiden Ki (カイ, Kai) from the demon Druaga. In order to do this, he must traverse through 60 floors of an immense tower. Gilgamesh comes equipped with a sword, which he can use to defeat monsters, and a shield, which can be used to block magical attacks.

The Return of Ishtar 

It picks up where Tower of Druaga left off. The player controls two characters: Ki as well as Gilgamesh. It can also be noted in this game that Ki is a magician, not a damsel in distress like many people believe. The tower now has a few different ways to exit, and the aggregate total of levels is 128 (covering the 60-floor tower).

The Quest of Ki 

The story of The Quest of Ki is actually a prequel to the original Tower of Druaga. It occurs shortly after the demon Druaga has stolen the Blue Crystal Rod and taken it to his tower. The goddess Ishtar sends the priestess Ki to the tower in order to retrieve it. The game then follows her doomed quest to the top of the tower, and leads directly into the story of the original game.

The Blue Crystal Rod 
Also known as "The Destiny of Gilgamesh", this game picks up where Return of Ishtar left off and is the final game in the Tower of Druaga series, according to Namco.

The Nightmare of Druaga 

This game is set three years after the original Tower of Druaga tetralogy. In it, Ki and Gilgamesh are about to be married, only for Ki to be kidnapped by an evil sorceress, Skulld. The game is known for its unforgiving difficulty, as death in the game results in losing all items and half gold, and its harsh penalty for resetting. Should a player reset the game, they will be greeted by Ishtar, who will scold them for "meddling with the flow of time".

Nightmare was not made by Namco, but by two other companies called Arika and Chunsoft. It was far less successful than the prior games, and was even given a low rating in a video game magazine. This game is the fifth in the "Druaga series" (not counting "Drururuaga"), and the eighth in the aforementioned Mystery Dungeon series.

Seme COM Dungeon: Drururuaga 
This game is placed about 100 years after the original Druaga timeline and stars Gilsh, a descendant of Gilgamesh. Gameplay is best described as a dungeon-building capture the flag with collectible cards. The players use cards to equip character with weapons and spells, and to populate dungeon with monsters. Then the players battle against an opponent and his dungeon (AI or link cable). The players enter the opponent's dungeon via linked teleporters, find the three keys to unlock the crystal, and return it to home base before the opponent does the same. Success yields additional cards. Each item or monster is highly specialized, allowing for different strategic combos. It features many Namco cameos, such as Soulcalibur Nightmare, the sword Soul Edge, Valkyrie, Pac-Man, and even the enemies from Dig Dug.

Druaga Online: The Story of Aon 
This game is set outside the main chronology of the series, and borrows characters from Namco's Valkyrie series. Gameplay is similar to The Return of Ishtar, only four players may play at the same time; each controlling one of the four available characters: Gil, a young version of Ki, Valkyrie, or an ancient golem named Xeovalga. Players also earn gold from killing enemies that can be used to upgrade equipment.

The Tower of Druaga: the Recovery of BABYLIM 
This game is an MMORPG developed as part of the Tower of Druaga "Animation x Online RPG" project which also includes the anime series The Tower of Druaga: the Aegis of Uruk.

Anime series 

An anime series titled "Druaga no Tō ~the Aegis of URUK~" ("The Tower of Druaga: The Aegis Of Uruk") premiered on April 5, 2008, both on Japanese television and with simultaneous streaming in English on YouTube, Crunchyroll and Bost TV. The series acts as a direct sequel to the original game.

Notes

References

Bandai Namco Entertainment franchises
Video game franchises introduced in 1984
Fantasy video games
High fantasy video games
Video game franchises
Action role-playing video games